George I of Münsterberg (also: George I of Poděbrady;  or ;  or Jiří z Poděbrad; 2 October 1470, Litice Castle – 10 November 1502, Oleśnica) was  a member of the House of Poděbrady and a Duke of the Silesian Duchies of Münsterberg and Oels and Count of Glatz.

Life 
George was a grandson of the King George of Poděbrady of Bohemia. His parents were Duke Henry the Elder of Munsterberg-Oels and Ursula of Brandenburg, daughter of the Elector Albert III Achilles of Brandenburg.

George's brother Albert married in 1487 to a daughter of the Duke John II "the Mad" of Żagań.  In 1488, George himself and his brother Charles I also married with daughters of John II. George's wife was Hedwig (1476–1524).

After their father's death in 1498, the three brothers Albert, George and Charles ruled jointly at first, but each lived on his own castle: Albert in Kłodzko, George in Oleśnica and Charles in Ziębice and from 1530 in his newly built castle in Ząbkowice Śląskie. Although the three brothers had sold the County of Glatz in 1501 to their future brother-in-law Ulrich of Hardegg, they retained the title of Counts of Glatz for themselves and their descendants until the Münsterberg line of the Poděbrady branch of the Kunštát family died out in the male line in 1647.

George was a patron of the spa facilities of Lądek-Zdrój.  Soon after his father's  death, he started the construction of the local "George Bath" with a residential house and the St. George's Chapel. In 1501 he issued the first bath regulations for Landeck.

References 
  (added entry in the article Johann II., Herzog in Schlesien und Herr zu Sagan)
  (added entry in the article Johann II., Herzog in Schlesien und Herr zu Sagan)
 Arno Herzig, Małgorzata Ruchniewicz: Geschichte des Glatzer Landes. Hamburg-Wrocław 2006, p. 54–59

External links 
 

Bohemian nobility
Dukes of Münsterberg
Podiebrad family
1470 births
1502 deaths